Bear-in-the-Lodge Creek is a stream in the U.S. state of South Dakota.

Tradition has it Bear-in-the-Lodge Creek received its name from an incident when a bear entered an Indian village near the creek.

See also
List of rivers of South Dakota

References

Rivers of Bennett County, South Dakota
Rivers of Jackson County, South Dakota
Rivers of South Dakota